Two Sassoon baronetcies were created, in 1890 and 1909 respectively, for members of the Anglo-Indo-Iraqi and Indo-Iraqi branches of the Sassoon family of Baghdadi Jewish descent.

The Sassoon baronetcy of Kensington-gore and of Eastern-terrace was created in the Baronetage of the United Kingdom on 22 March 1890 for the Anglo-Iraqi businessman Albert (formerly Abdullah) Sassoon, whose family hailed from Baghdad. The second Baronet, Sir Edward Sassoon, represented Hythe as a Liberal Unionist Party Member of Parliament from May 1899 until his death in 1912.

The third Baronet, Sir Philip Sassoon, was a Conservative British politician, art collector and social host, who represented Hythe in the House of Commons from 1912. He served as Under-Secretary of State for Air from 1924 to 1929 and again from 1931 to 1937, and First Commissioner of Public Works in 1937. He was appointed Privy Councillor in 1929. On his death in 1939, the baronetcy became extinct.

The Sassoon baronetcy of Bombay was created on 9 February 1909 for Sir Albert's nephew, Jacob Elias Sassoon. He had no children, so a special remainder enabled his younger brother to inherit. The third Baronet was also childless, thus the title became extinct upon his death in 1961.

The special remainder is as follows:			
The special remainder to the baronetcy of Sassoon created in 1909	
From the "London Gazette" of 2 February 1909 (issue 28220, page 826):-	
'The King has been pleased to give directions for the preparation of a Warrant for His Majesty's
Royal Sign Manual, authorizing Letters Patent to be passed under the Great Seal of the United
Kingdom of Great Britain and Ireland, conferring the dignity of a Baronet of the said United
Kingdom upon Jacob Elias Sassoon, of the City of Bombay, in the Empire of India, Esquire, and
the heirs male of his body lawfully begotten, with remainder to Edward Elias Sassoon, of	
Grosvenor-place, in the City of Westminster, Esquire, and the heirs male of his body lawfully
begotten.'

On this basis, the line failed on the death of the third Baronet. The title could not have been transferred by adoption and is therefore extinct.

Sassoon baronets, of Kensington-gore and of Eastern-terrace (1890)
Sir Albert Abdullah David Sassoon, 1st Baronet (25 July 1818 – 24 October 1896), father of
Sir Edward Albert Sassoon, 2nd Baronet (20 June 1856 – 24 May 1912), father of
Sir Philip Albert Gustave David Sassoon, 3rd Baronet (4 December 1888 – 3 June 1939)

Sassoon baronets, of Bombay (1909)
Sir Jacob Elias Sassoon, 1st Baronet (1844 – 22 October 1916). Sasson was the elder son of Elias David Sassoon. He had no children and was succeeded under a special remainder in the letters patent by his younger brother Edward. He also built the Knesset Eliyahoo in Mumbai (1885), Ohel Leah in Hong Kong, and Ohel Rachel in Shanghai (completed posthumously).
Sir Edward Elias Sassoon, 2nd Baronet (6 January 1853 – 2 December 1924). Sassoon was the younger son of Elias David Sassoon and succeeded in the baronetcy on the death of his brother. He was a businessman and was succeeded in the baronetcy by his son Victor.
Sir (Ellice) Victor Sassoon, 3rd Baronet (20 December 1881 – 13 August 1961). Known as Victor Sassoon, he was the son of Edward Elias Sassoon.

See also
 David Sassoon & Co.
 E.D. Sassoon & Co.
 James Sassoon, Baron Sassoon

References

External links
 Article on the second branch of the family – the Chinese Sassoons. Retrieved 16 August 2007.

Sassoon
Baronetcies created with special remainders
English Jews
Iraqi Jews
Indian Jews
British people of Iraqi-Jewish descent
British people of Indian-Jewish descent
People from Mumbai